Neyzeh may refer to:
 Neyzeh-ye Olya
 Neyzeh-ye Sofla